There are 71 mammal species in the Czech Republic, of which one is endangered, six are vulnerable, and four are near threatened.

The following tags are used to highlight each species' conservation status as published by the International Union for Conservation of Nature:

Order: Rodentia (rodents) 

Rodents make up the largest order of mammals, with over 40% of mammalian species. They have two incisors in the upper and lower jaw which grow continually and must be kept short by gnawing.

Suborder: Sciurognathi
Family: Castoridae (beavers)
Genus: Castor
Eurasian beaver, C. fiber 
Family: Sciuridae (squirrels)
Subfamily: Sciurinae
Genus: Sciurus
 Red squirrel, S. vulgaris 
Subfamily: Xerinae
Genus: Spermophilus
 European ground squirrel, S. citellus VU
Family: Gliridae (dormice)
Subfamily: Leithiinae
Genus: Dryomys
 Forest dormouse, Dryomys nitedula LC
Genus: Eliomys
 Garden dormouse, E. quercinus 
Genus: Muscardinus
 Hazel dormouse, Muscardinus avellanarius LC
Subfamily: Glirinae
Genus: Glis
 European edible dormouse, Glis glis LC
Family: Dipodidae (jerboas)
Subfamily: Sicistinae
Genus: Sicista
 Northern birch mouse, Sicista betulina LC
Family: Cricetidae
Subfamily: Cricetinae
Genus: Cricetus
 European hamster, Cricetus cricetus LC
Subfamily: Arvicolinae
Genus: Arvicola
 European water vole, A. amphibius 
Genus: Clethrionomys
 Bank vole, Clethrionomys glareolus LC
Genus: Microtus
 Field vole, Microtus agrestis LC
 Common vole, Microtus arvalis LC
 Tundra vole, Microtus oeconomus LC
Family: Muridae (mice, rats, voles, gerbils, hamsters)
Subfamily: Murinae
Genus: Apodemus
 Wood mouse, Apodemus sylvaticus LC
 Yellow-necked mouse, Apodemus flavicollis LC
 Ural field mouse, Apodemus uralensis LC
Genus: Micromys
 Eurasian harvest mouse, Micromys minutus LC
Genus: Mus
 House mouse, Mus musculus LC
 Steppe mouse, Mus spicilegus LC

Order: Lagomorpha (lagomorphs) 

The lagomorphs comprise two families, Leporidae (hares and rabbits), and Ochotonidae (pikas). Though they can resemble rodents, and were classified as a superfamily in that order until the early 20th century, they have since been considered a separate order. They differ from rodents in a number of physical characteristics, such as having four incisors in the upper jaw rather than two.

Family: Leporidae (rabbits, hares)
Genus: Lepus
 European hare, L. europaeus 
Genus: Oryctolagus
European rabbit, O. cuniculus  introduced

Order: Erinaceomorpha (hedgehogs and gymnures) 

The order Erinaceomorpha contains a single family, Erinaceidae, which comprise the hedgehogs and gymnures. The hedgehogs are easily recognised by their spines while gymnures look more like large rats.

Family: Erinaceidae (hedgehogs)
Subfamily: Erinaceinae
Genus: Erinaceus
 West European hedgehog, E. europaeus 
 Northern white-breasted hedgehog, E. roumanicus

Order: Soricomorpha (shrews, moles, and solenodons) 

The "shrew-forms" are insectivorous mammals. The shrews and solenodons closely resemble mice while the moles are stout-bodied burrowers.
Family: Soricidae (shrews)
Subfamily: Crocidurinae
Genus: Crocidura
 Bicolored shrew, C. leucodon 
 Greater white-toothed shrew, C. russula 
Lesser white-toothed shrew, C. suaveolens 
Subfamily: Soricinae
Tribe: Nectogalini
Genus: Neomys
 Southern water shrew, N. anomalus 
 Eurasian water shrew, N. fodiens 
Tribe: Soricini
Genus: Sorex
 Alpine shrew, S. alpinus 
 Common shrew, S. araneus 
 Eurasian pygmy shrew, S. minutus 
Family: Talpidae (moles)
Subfamily: Talpinae
Tribe: Talpini
Genus: Talpa
 European mole, T. europaea

Order: Chiroptera (bats) 

The bats' most distinguishing feature is that their forelimbs are developed as wings, making them the only mammals capable of flight. Bat species account for about 20% of all mammals.
Family: Vespertilionidae
Subfamily: Myotinae
Genus: Myotis
Bechstein's bat, M. bechsteini 
Brandt's bat, M. brandti 
Pond bat, M. dasycneme 
Greater mouse-eared bat, M. myotis 
Daubenton's bat, M. daubentonii  
Geoffroy's bat, M. emarginatus 
Whiskered bat, M. mystacinus 
Natterer's bat, M. nattereri 
Subfamily: Vespertilioninae
Genus: Barbastella
Western barbastelle, B. barbastellus 
Genus: Eptesicus
 Northern bat, E. nilssoni LC
 Serotine bat, E. serotinus LC
Genus: Nyctalus
Lesser noctule, N. leisleri 
Common noctule, N. noctula 
Genus: Pipistrellus
Nathusius' pipistrelle, P. nathusii 
 Common pipistrelle, P. pipistrellus LC
Genus: Plecotus
Brown long-eared bat, P. auritus 
 Grey long-eared bat, P. austriacus LC
Genus: Vespertilio
 Parti-coloured bat, V. murinus LC
Family: Rhinolophidae
Subfamily: Rhinolophinae
Genus: Rhinolophus
Greater horseshoe bat, R. ferrumequinum 
Lesser horseshoe bat, R. hipposideros

Order: Carnivora (carnivorans) 

There are over 260 species of carnivorans, the majority of which feed primarily on meat. They have a characteristic skull shape and dentition. 
Suborder: Feliformia
Family: Felidae (cats)
Subfamily: Felinae
Genus: Felis
European wildcat, F. silvestris 
Genus: Lynx
Eurasian lynx, L. lynx 
Suborder: Caniformia
Family: Canidae (dogs, foxes)
Genus: Canis
Golden jackal, C. aureus 
European jackal, C. a. moreoticus
Gray wolf, C. lupus 
Genus: Vulpes
Red fox, V. vulpes 
Family: Ursidae (bears)
Genus: Ursus
Brown bear, U. arctos LC presence uncertain
Family: Mustelidae (mustelids)
Genus: Lutra
European otter, L. lutra 
Genus: Martes
Beech marten, M. foina 
Pine marten, M. martes LC
Genus: Meles
European badger, M. meles 
Genus: Mustela
Steppe polecat, M. eversmannii 
European mink, M. lutreola  extirpated
Stoat, M. erminea 
Least weasel, M. nivalis 
European polecat, M. putorius 
Genus: Neogale
American mink, N. vison  presence uncertain, introduced

Order: Artiodactyla (even-toed ungulates) 

The even-toed ungulates are ungulates whose weight is borne about equally by the third and fourth toes, rather than mostly or entirely by the third as in perissodactyls. There are about 220 artiodactyl species, including many that are of great economic importance to humans.
Family: Bovidae (bovids)
Subfamily: Bovinae
Genus: Bison
 European bison, B. bonasus  extirpated
Carpathian wisent, B. b. hungarorum 
Subfamily: Caprinae
Genus: Rupicapra
Chamois, R. rupicapra  introduced
Family: Cervidae (deer)
Subfamily: Capreolinae
Genus: Alces
 Moose, A. alces LC
Genus: Capreolus
Roe deer, C. capreolus 
Subfamily: Cervinae
Genus: Cervus
Red deer, C. elaphus 
Genus: Dama
 European fallow deer, D. dama LC introduced
Family: Suidae (pigs)
Subfamily: Suinae
Genus: Sus
 Wild boar, S. scrofa LC

See also
List of chordate orders
Lists of mammals by region
List of prehistoric mammals
Mammal classification
List of mammals described in the 2000s

References

External links

Czech Republic
Mammals
Mammals
Czech